Ronald Herbert Frederickson (22 October 1918 – 21 May 1987) was an Australian rugby league footballer who played in the 1930s and 1940s.

Career
Frederickson was graded from the Barton United RLFC in 1935 and reached First Grade the following year. A five-eighth with great skills, Frederickson had many fine seasons at St. George although he suffered many bad injuries and broken bones during his career. He retired at the end of 1940 due to his enlistment in the Australian Army in World War II.

War service
Afrer joining the AIF in 1941, he served until his discharge in 1944 and then joined the RAAF as a Leading Aircraftman until the end of the war.

Death
Frederickson died on 21 May 1987 in Campbelltown, New South Wales aged 68.

References

1918 births
1987 deaths
St. George Dragons players
Australian Army personnel of World War II
Australian rugby league players
Rugby league players from Sydney
Rugby league five-eighths
Australian Army soldiers
Royal Australian Air Force personnel of World War II
Royal Australian Air Force airmen